Timothy Weeden (born November 13, 1951) is a Wisconsin politician, legislator, and realtor.

Born in Beloit, Wisconsin, Weeden graduated from Beloit Memorial High School. He received a bachelor's degree in political science from Wheaton College in 1973 and then a masters in business administration from the University of Wisconsin–Whitewater. From 1982 to 1983, Weeden served on the Beloit Board of Education. He was elected to the Wisconsin State Assembly as a Republican in 1985 and then to the Wisconsin State Senate in 1987, in a special election, serving until 1999 when he retired from the Wisconsin Legislature. As of 2008, Weeden worked for Hendricks Group in Beloit as the director of governmental affairs.

Notes

Politicians from Beloit, Wisconsin
Wheaton College (Illinois) alumni
University of Wisconsin–Whitewater alumni
School board members in Wisconsin
Republican Party members of the Wisconsin State Assembly
Republican Party Wisconsin state senators
1951 births
Living people